The Palestinian Center for Policy and Survey Research (PSR) (ar: المركز الفلسطيني للبحوث السياسية والمسحية) is a Palestinian research organisation and think tank based in Ramallah established for "advancing scholarship and knowledge on immediate issues of concern to Palestinians in three areas: domestic politics and government, strategic analysis and foreign policy, and public opinion polls and survey research". It has been conducting opinion polls in these fields since the mid-1990s.

It is the Palestinian counterpart of the Arab Barometer poll.

The organization has been the object of hostility ranging from pressure from the Palestinian Authority to mob violence.

References

External links
 PSR
 Latest poll
 ETH Zurich Center for Security Studies listing

Organizations based in the State of Palestine